The Pan-African Federation was a multinational Pan-African organization founded in Manchester, United Kingdom, in 1944.

Participating groups 
Participating groups included:
 Negro Association (Manchester)
 Coloured Workers Association (London)
 Coloured Peoples Association (Edinburgh)
 African Union (Glasgow)
 United Committee of Colonial and Coloured Peoples' Associations (Cardiff)
 Association of Students of African Descent (Dublin)
 Kikuyu Central Association (Kenya) represented by Jomo Kenyatta
 West African Youth League (Sierra Leone section) represented by Isaac Wallace-Johnson
 Friends of African Freedom Society (Gold Coast)

Aims
Its aims were:
 To promote the well-being and unity of African peoples and peoples of African descent throughout the world
 To demand self-determination and independence of African peoples, and other subject races from the domination of powers claiming sovereignty and trusteeship over them
 To secure equality of civil rights for African peoples and the total abolition of all forms of racial discrimination.
 To strive to co-operate between African peoples and others who share our aspirations.

See also
Decolonization of Africa
First Pan-African Conference
Pan-African Congress
Pan-Africanism
United States of Latin Africa

References 

Pan-Africanist organizations in Europe
Organizations established in 1944
Pan-Africanism in the United Kingdom
British Empire in World War II